

Zabu

Zadkiel
Zadkiel is a former archangel in the service of Heaven and an enemy of the Ghost Rider, named after the mythical angel of the same name. Created by Jason Aaron, the character debuted in Ghost Rider (vol. 4) #27.

Zadkiel was in charge of overseeing the Spirits of Vengeance in God's army, and gradually developed a hatred of humanity as God favored the sinners over the angels. This led him to decide to overpower and dethrone God, something that he would need the power of Spirits of Vengeance to do. It was revealed that he had endowed Johnny Blaze with the powers of the Ghost Rider.

As a backup plan Zadkiel used Blaze's brother, Daniel Ketch. Danny was once the host for the Ghost Rider entity, and after he had exorcised the spirit he went into withdrawal. Falling off the wagon Danny soon found himself once again host to a new variation of the Ghost Rider. Zadkiel had tricked Danny into believing that by killing other Spirits of Vengeance he would be freeing the human hosts. What Danny did not realize was that by destroying the Spirits of Vengeance, he was fueling Zadkiel, making him all-powerful.

Danny blindly led Zadkiel's army, the Black Host, into war with Blaze and the last remaining Ghost Riders. Danny and Blaze soon came into conflict, and Danny and Zadkiel's army were able to overpower Blaze and his allies. When Danny ascends to Heaven to deliver the last of the spirits, Zadkiel turns on him, casting him back to Earth. With his enhanced abilities, Zadkiel was able to apparently usurp the throne from God and instill himself as the new ruler of Heaven.

His reign was short-lived, however, as Danny and Blaze had arrived in Heaven to challenge him. With the assistance of the deceased Ghost Riders of the past, the brothers were able to overthrow Zadkiel and return Heaven to God; Zadkiel realized that though he might have, seemingly, been able to shift the power that fueled the Ghost Riders from its hosts, and even leech it from them, he could neither control nor destroy it, as only the one true God possessed that power, which he was not. Zadkiel is currently imprisoned in Hell, condemned by an enraged God for his treachery to be tortured for all eternity for his horrific crimes against Paradise and Creation.

 Powers and abilities
Zadkiel has not revealed the full extent of his powers, but is essentially immortal. The sole ability he has demonstrated so far is that he can mutilate and destroy human souls. He did have a semblance of what seemed to be the Creator's power briefly and used the power to create havoc on Earth, erasing people from existence, though it is ultimately revealed that while he may have able to drain a portion of the power of the Spirits of Vengeance from them temporarily, he was not, and never would be, the one true God and could thus never truly claim dominion over Heaven for long, much less all Creation.

 Other versions
During the 2015 "Secret Wars" story line, a variation of Zadkiel resides in the Battleworld domain of Doomstadt and works for Arcade as the Killiseum's chief of security. As Arcade planned to destabilize Robbie Reyes, Zadkiel warned him that Robbie draws his power from a different source. After Robbie escapes with the help of the ghost of Eli Morrow, Arcade orders Zadkiel to send the Ghost Racers to hunt him down. When the Ghost Racers corner Robbie, Arcade kidnaps his brother Gabe Reyes and plans to have him race in Robbie's place. This causes Robbie to return to the Killiseum. Once at the Killiseum, Zadkiel orders the Ghost Racers to kill Robbie and to unleash the Venus Compiler on him as well. When Robbie frees the other Ghost Racers, they help to destroy the Venus Compiler. Zadkiel plans to kill Gabe, but Robbie instead kills Zadkiel by consuming his soul.

Zaladane
Zaladane is a fictional character, a sorceress and the high priestess of the sun god Garokk, the Petrified Man. The character first appeared in Astonishing Tales #3 and was created by Gerry Conway and Barry Windsor-Smith. She is the alleged sister of Polaris, a claim made at a time when Polaris' own parentage had not yet been confirmed.

Zaladane was the war-like high priestess and queen of the Sun People, who live in the Savage Land. She attempted to lead the Sun People in a war to conquer the peoples of the Savage Land. Her army's weapons were destroyed by Garokk, so she attempted to force Garokk to do her bidding but was attacked by him. She was defeated by Ka-Zar and seemingly destroyed. Zaladane later reappeared, and magically transformed her captive Kirk Marston into Garokk, endowing him with the original Garokk's consciousness. She aided Garokk in attempting to unite the Savage Land tribes under his leadership. She captured the X-Men and Ka-Zar, but was thwarted by the X-Men.

Years later, Zaladane became the assistant of the High Evolutionary in his project to restore the Savage Land after its near destruction by the alien Terminus. Zaladane was allied with the Savage Land Mutates (Savage Land natives who had been given superhuman powers through artificially induced mutation by Magneto), and with them plotted to conquer the Savage Land.

In her quest for power she, with the help of the Mutate Worm, enslaved many of the land's natives and abducted Polaris to steal her magnetic powers with some machinery supplied by Brainchild. It was here she claimed to Lorna that she was actually her "sister". Zaladane then led an army in an attempt to conquer the Savage Land. She captured Ka-Zar, Shanna, and various X-Men, but is defeated by them. When Lorna arrived at Muir Island after losing her magnetic powers, she was examined by Moira MacTaggert due to the sudden appearance of a new power mutation. Moira confirmed during testing that the only way Zaladane could have taken Lorna's powers away was if she was a biological sibling.

With Polaris' magnetic powers, Zaladane took over the Savage Land. She led her army and the Savage Land mutates against Magneto, Ka-Zar, Rogue, Nick Fury, and S.H.I.E.L.D. forces in the Savage Land. She sought world domination, and captured Magneto, Shanna, and Nereel, and attempted to steal Magneto's powers as well. After a series of attacks using the various tribes in that region they managed to distract Zaladane, allowing Magneto to use the machine to regain his power. Shortly afterwards, Magneto executed Zaladane, who was impaled by an object propelled by magnetic forces projected by Magneto. At the time of her death, neither Zaladane nor Magneto were aware of their potential blood relation.

Some time after Zaladane's death and the Shadow King incident, Polaris' powers were returned to her.

Zaladane is a sorceress with an extensive knowledge of sorcery, and the ability to wield and manipulate the forces of magic for an undefined variety of effects. She primarily has used these powers for mind control and limited energy projection. For a time she wielded the ability to control magnetic forces in a manner similar to Magneto, but of a more limited nature.

She claimed to be a mutate (a mutagenically altered human rather than a born mutant). However, the nature of her artificially induced mutation was never revealed. She was able to steal the powers of Polaris and Magneto for a time with the assistance of a machine.

Zaladane was trained in the combat skills of the Sun People. She sometimes wore body armor of an unknown composition, and wielded spears, and torch-bombs (chemically-filled incendiary bombs). She had access to various scientifically advanced equipment, including skysleds (advanced air vehicles), and devices such as the transmutator, formerly belonging to the High Evolutionary and modified by Brainchild. Zaladane also rode dinosaurs, pterodactyls, and diatrymas (giant flightless birds) trained to carry riders.

Zaladane in other media
Zaladane appeared in the X-Men: The Animated Series two-part episode "Savage Land, Strange Heart". She worked with Garokk in a plot to free him. Eventually, the plot was stopped due to a fight between Garokk and Sauron that re-imprisoned Garrokk in the Savage Land.

Zaran

Maximillian Zaran 
Maximillian Zaran, a British character, was created by Mike Zeck and first appeared in Master of Kung Fu (vol. 2) #77 (June 1979). Formerly an agent of the British Secret Service: MI-6, he becomes a mercenary and assassin, training himself thoroughly in martial arts and the use of various kinds of weapons. His first superhero battle is against Shang-Chi, the Master of Kung-Fu, who easily defeats him, although Zaran later defeats the hero in turn. Zaran then joins Batroc's Brigade, and is hired by Obadiah Stane to steal Captain America's shield. He later joins forces with Razorfist II and Shockwave and fights the West Coast Avengers.

During the Bloodstone Hunt, Zaran becomes good friends with fellow mercenary Batroc. The Brigade is employed by Baron Zemo to acquire the fragments of the Bloodstone, and Zaran fights Captain America and Diamondback but loses. They are later hired by Maelstrom to help him build a device capable of destroying the universe and battle the Great Lakes Avengers, during which he kills the newly initiated G.L.A. member Grasshopper.

At one point, Zaran trains a successor called Zhou Man She, who Shang-Chi defeats in battle.

Although he has no superhuman abilities, he is an extremely athletic man with knowledge of numerous forms of armed and unarmed combat and of such varied weapons as knives, bows, staffs, maces, spears, nunchakus, shuriken, and guns. He wears a leather outfitted with a variety of specialized clips, loops, and pockets for carrying weapons. He usually carries small sais (three pronged daggers) attached to his gauntlets, collar and codpiece, a bo staff/spear/blow gun, and a wide variety of weapons as needed.

Other versions of Zaran 
In House of M, Zaran is a member of the criminal organization Shang-Chi's Dragons, alongside Mantis, the Swordsman, and Machete.  He is killed by Bullseye after the Dragons are ambushed by the Kingpin's assassins.

Zaran in other media 
Zaran appears in the video game Spider-Man and Captain America in Doctor Doom's Revenge (1989).

Zaran II / Zhou Man She 
Zhou Man She was trained by the original Zara.

Zaran is employed by the Shadow-Hand to steal a chemical elixir from A.I.M. for Shang-Chi's father, a super-villain sometimes known as Fu Manchu. He is then ordered to kill Shang-Chi himself and commanded Dacoits to fight Shang-Chi and Marvel Knights.

Princess Zanda

Princess Zanda is a fictional character in the Marvel Universe. This character, created by Jack Kirby, first appeared in Black Panther #1 (January 1977). She was the ruler of the African nation of Narobia and a potential love interest of T'Challa/Black Panther.

Princess Zanda in other media
Princess Zanda appears in Avengers Assemble, voiced primarily by Mela Lee, while her disguises are voiced by other voice actors. This version has the ability to shapeshift and is a member of the Shadow Council. Introduced in the episode "Mists of Attilan", she imprisons and disguises herself as Crystal to trick T'Challa and Kamala Khan into leading her to a piece of the Panther's Key and the Wakandan crown. In the episodes "The Last Avenger" and "The Vibranium Curtain", Zanda impersonates Black Widow, frames Black Panther for murder following Captain America's apparent death, and turns the Avengers against Black Panther. In the episode "King Breaker", Zanda uses Iron Man's technology to create a bomb in an attempt to destroy Atlantis, but Captain America and Black Panther discover Zanda's ruse and true identity. She battles Black Panther until a fissure opens beneath them, causing her to fall through. It is unknown if she survived the fall or not.

Peter Van Zante 
Peter Van Zante (originally known as Water Wizard and later Aqueduct), is a fictional character appearing in American comic books published by Marvel Comics.

The character first appeared in Ghost Rider #23 (April 1977) and was created by Jim Shooter and Don Heck.

Peter Van Zante enlists in the U.S. military as a soldier. After being wounded in action, he is treated with an experimental radiation device while out at sea. A lightning strike during a freak storm destroys the device but Van Zante is rejuvenated. While convalescing, Van Zante discovers he can manipulate water and create semi-solid three-dimensional shapes. Becoming a professional criminal, Van Zante dons a costume and adopts the alias of Water Wizard, and robs a brokerage house. He is then employed by the criminal the Enforcer and assigned to kill Ghost Rider, but fails. He salvages the Enforcer's ring from San Diego harbor, and battles and is defeated by Ghost Rider. The magician Moondark also recruits Water Wizard in Chicago to battle Ghost Rider, but Water Wizard is burned by Ghost Rider's mystical flames again; he goes into shock and is institutionalized. Ghost Rider then breaks van Zante out of prison shortly afterwards to assist a drought-stricken town. At this time van Zante travels to Saudi Arabia, where he discovers he can also affect forms of liquid other than water, including oil, and after a brief criminal venture and battling the Arabian Knight, he is returned to prison by Ghost Rider. Although Water Wizard is later employed by criminal mastermind Justin Hammer to battle Iron Man with several other villains, he panics and flees the fight, earning Hammer's enmity.

Gary Gilbert invites Water Wizard to attend a meeting at the Bar With No Name to discuss the threat of the Scourge of the Underworld. Due to a flat tire he is late to the meeting and is not present when the attendees, including Gilbert, are killed by the Scourge. Water Wizard subsequently discovers the 17 victims and turns himself in to Captain America, who later captures the assassin. Several years later during Acts of Vengeance, Water Wizard and many other villains are freed from prison by Doctor Doom to attack Four Freedoms Plaza and battle the Fantastic Four, but van Zante ends up arguing with and fighting against fellow villain Hydro-Man. Failure follows failure as Van Zante is sidelined by construction workers during a futile attack on the superhero team the Avengers, and is later defeated by Captain America in seconds.

Water Wizard eventually reappears with a new costume and alias — Aqueduct. He joins with three other super villains with elemental abilities to form the team Force of Nature. The group is employed by Project: Earth to prevent rain forest razing, and battles the superhero team the New Warriors. Battling the New Warriors later, Force of Nature is defeated again. Aqueduct then joins the fifth generation of the Masters of Evil and battles the superhero team the Thunderbolts.

During the Civil War storyline, Aqueduct is forced along with many other supervillains to join the Thunderbolts Army.

During the Dark Reign storyline, Aqueduct is revealed to be back with Force of Nature, which is now the Initiative's Oregon team.

A power surge in an experimental cell stimulator while out at sea gave Van Zante the psychokinetic ability to control and shape all forms of liquid (including oil) for virtually any effect, such as rainstorms, floods, tidal waves, water slides, and mobile animated water creatures. Aqueduct can manipulate thousands of gallons at a time. However, he cannot control the temperature of water or combine hydrogen and oxygen to create water.

Zarathos

Zarrko

Zealot
Zealot is a fictional character appearing in American comic books published by Marvel Comics.

Thomas Phillip Moreau is Philip Moreau's brother and one of the two sons of David Moreau who possesses terrakinesis. He opposed Magneto when he proclaimed as Genosha's ruler. Convening a large following, he created a resistance force against Magneto. He kidnapped Quicksilver and showed his body tied up to a cross. His actions horrified Rogue and Amelia Voght who sought for Magneto's help. Zealot faced his enemy, but was killed by Magneto who used his magnetic powers to imprison him with a metal cocoon and sent him to space. His death was a message to anyone who tried to oppose the master of magnetism.

Zealot in other media
Zealot appears in X-Men Legends II: Rise of Apocalypse, voiced by Armin Shimerman. He is the mid-boss in this game at Cerci Tunnels during first act, he uses his powers to control earth and plenty of his henchmen. Zealot is cheated by Apocalypse who promised to give Genosha's control to him if he attacked the X-Men and Magneto's Brotherhood of Mutants. He has special dialogue with Magneto.

Zeitgeist

X-Force

Special Executive

Larry Ekler

Helmut Zemo

Zephyr

Zero

Kenji Uedo

Zero first appeared in Generation Hope #1, in the final chapter of the "Five Lights" storyline, and the first storyline of the Generation Hope book, as a newly manifested mutant with dark intentions and a dangerous power. He was created by Matt Fraction and Kieron Gillen, and is one of the "Five Lights"—a group of mutants who manifested their abilities after the events of "Second Coming".

Following his introduction, he, along with Hope Summers, Velocidad, Transonic, Oya, and Primal, began to feature in the series Generation Hope. He is the last of the Five Lights to join Hope's team, as the first storyline of the Generation Hope series involves the team getting his power under control.  He continues to make appearances in The Uncanny X-Men as well.

From his introduction, Zero has seemed more distant from Hope and all the other Lights. He is the first of the Lights to acknowledge that Hope has changed them, possibly not for the better, and his dark tendencies appear to be heading him down the path of villainy. He has talked about betraying Hope, and he has mentioned that he believes he would be a lot like Magneto and his Brotherhood or Quentin Quire if he weren't tied to Hope. Additionally, whether subconsciously or not, he has created messages in his room talking about how there is "No Hope" and "No Future."

Kenji Uedo is a successful nineteen-year-old  artist from Tokyo, Japan, when his powers first appear. Though originally Kenji just seems to be a messy introvert with hygiene issues, his powers quickly manifest into uncontrollable organic tendrils, which kill his assistant and start to wreak havoc in Tokyo. Soon afterward, Cyclops, Wolverine, Rogue, Hope, and the other Lights arrive in Japan to find Kenji's organic tendrils destroying the city. After Cyclops, Wolverine, and Rogue fail to contain Kenji, Hope heads into his lair to attempt to stabilize his powers, but Kenji attacks Hope by latching tendrils onto her head, which appears to cause an explosion that destroys most of Tokyo. However, this is an illusion, created on a telepathic plane by Kenji so he can live his fantasies. Hope mimics Kenji's power, and sees that Kenji has her pinned to a wall. Hope escapes, but is rendered unconscious by her powers; she is rescued by Velocidad before she falls to the ground.

Using his powers, Kenji becomes a large creature, and he begins to rampage through the city, à la an old monster movie. Hope soon awakens, and she and the other Lights demonstrate their teamwork by getting Hope close enough to Kenji to once again mimic his powers, all while keeping each other safe. Hope becomes a similar creature, and begins to battle Kenji while the two talk telepathically. Kenji scoffs at Hope, and sarcastically asks if she thinks she can save him. When she doesn't reply, Kenji realizes that she does think she can save him, but he tells her that he thinks it's too late. Despite this, Hope defeats Kenji and is able to get his powers under control via a touch, which knocks them both unconscious.

Kenji is taken to Utopia, where he is shown footage of the destruction he caused in Tokyo. Kenji is remorseful, admitting that he has fantasies of killing people, and he wants the X-Men's help to ensure that he never goes on a rampage again. After Emma Frost probes his mind, she convinces Cyclops that Kenji truly is remorseful, and Cyclops agrees to help Kenji. Later, after Hope says she's staying on Utopia, Kenji and the other Lights agree to do the same, but Kenji decides to remain more isolated than his teammates.

When a Sixth Light is discovered in Germany, Hope and the Lights (including Kenji) head there to retrieve it. However, they find that the Light is actually a powerfully telepathic unborn infant, who has taken control of every person within the hospital its mother is staying at. Kenji hooks his tendrils into each of his teammates' necks, granting them immunity from the telepath's influence, and the group heads into the hospital, and convince the baby to be born. Hope touches the child, and its X-gene is suppressed until it hits puberty.

After Hope decides that each of the Lights needs their own codename, Kenji begins to consider his several options. At first, he suggests Derivative or Rei (Japanese for Zero, and a reference to Rei Ayanami from Neon Genesis Evangelion) before settling on simply Zero. Later, after Primal wins the right to stay on Utopia, Zero wonders if Primal truly is happy on Utopia or if he is faking it to remain close to Hope. He and Transonic acknowledge that Hope has changed them all, and Zero doesn't think it's quite right. He reveals that he had considered another codename to spit back at their "messiah": Judas.

Later, a Seventh Light appears in the United Kingdom. The Light is a boy named Zeeshan, whose skin appears to be melting from his body. One of Zeeshan's friends begin to tease him and begins to take photos and post them onto the internet. Though Hope and the Lights (including Zero) rush to the UK, the group is too late, as Zeeshan has already killed himself after his friend "ruined" his life. Four weeks later, Zero is seen outside that friend's apartment, sending a drone in to kill the boy. However, he is stopped by Wolverine, who tells him "It gets better, kid."

As he returns from an obviously tiring mission, Wolverine encounters Hope and the Lights, including Zero, awaiting his return so they can start Combat Training class. Wolverine cancels the class he had no knowledge of, and instead asks them if they shouldn't be doing something more age appropriate.

Zero is one of the X-Men to attend the opening of a Mutant History Museum, a group that includes several adult and younger mutants. He got there early, as he wanted to view the "classic design" of the Sentinel. He then criticizes the leaders of the world for restarting the Sentinel Program after Quentin Quire made them tell their darkest truths on television. He mentions that he believes that he would be a lot like Magneto and his Brotherhood or Quire if he weren't tied to Hope. When the Museum is attacked by the new Hellfire Club, most of the X-Men are quickly defeated and Zero is nowhere to be seen. He reappears outside with Hope and the other Lights after Oya's "murder" of the Hellfire grunts. He asks Oya if she is okay, but she mortifies Zero, Hope, and the other Lights by only asking if there is anyone else she needs to kill.

The Schism event concludes with the separation of the X-Men into two different teams (one led by Cyclops and the other by Wolverine). Velocidad, Transonic, Primal, and Zero choose to stay on Utopia with Hope while Idie leaves with Wolverine for the rebuilt X-Mansion now named the Jean Grey School for Higher Learning. The team later gets two new members, Pixie and No-Girl (who becomes somewhat close to Zero for a brief period of time).

During a training exercise Hope and the remaining lights on Utopia spar against the likes of Colossus, Storm, Magik, Namor, Psylocke, and Magneto. Zero goes too far and infuriates Magneto during the fight when he digs his techno-organic tendrils into the mutant's eyes. In retaliation Magneto tears Kenji apart by manipulating the metals in his body. To everyone's surprise, Kenji survives the vicious attack and literally pulls himself back together.

Shortly after the sparring exercise Hope learns that the Stepford Cuckoos have discovered a new light in Pakistan and chose to keep it from her. Hope has Pixie transport the team to meet the mystery mutant who is later revealed to be Sebastian Shaw. During the mission, the front lobe of No-Girl is destroyed when Sebastian Shaw detonates himself. Zero then uses his techno-organic powers to make her a new body from parts of his own.

When The Lights are attacked by a group of Utopia residents jealous of the young team's status with the X-Men, Hope usurps Zero's control over his powers to force an end to the conflict. This incident galvanizes Zero's distrust of the young leader, who he believes means to subjugate all mutants with her immense power. Using implants he had placed into the brains of a number of Utopia inhabitants, he manipulates a large group of mutants into clamoring for Hope's death.  During the ensuing battle, Martha Johansson disrupts Zero's powers, killing him and freeing the affected mutants from his influence.

While traveling the globe, Storm discovered Kenji alive and well, but without the memory of his time among the X-Men. After several exams, it is discovered that Kenji had not died as everyone had thought. His power had restored him after the battle with Martha Johansson. Storm believed him and allowed him to stay, keeping him under close watch, but it didn't take long for Kenji to shatter his innocent facade. As it turned out Kenji was found by Davis Harmon, a cyborg and CEO of Eaglestar Industries, when the latter searched the ruins of Utopia to salvage its technology. Being held captive and tortured shattered Kenji's already fragile psyche and he began to blame the X-Men for his demise. Storm eventually took Harmon down and, unbeknownst to her, allowed Kenji to escape his underwater lab. Consumed with revenge, Kenji was disgusted that Storm was spreading hope and fellowship everywhere but had rejected him and let him die when he showed his true colors during his attack on Hope. He began to attack the school and simultaneously unleashed armies of his techno-organic "meat puppets" on the places around the world that Storm had recently helped. He connected himself to Storm so that she could watch her friends die but this only allowed Storm to use her powers on a global scale and she destroyed his armies. Defeated, Kenji tried to goad Storm into killing him, which would prove that her inclusive dream was a lie, because it could never include him. Storm refused and, still connected to his mind, showed Kenji that many of her friends, like Callisto and Forge, were once monsters, but still decided to fight for a better world. She also knew that, deep down, Kenji hoped the same could eventually be true of him. Kenji vanished, telling Storm that he'd see her around. Rachel Grey confirmed that his psionic presence was still in the area and was, surprisingly, at peace.

ADAM Unit Zero

Zero (Ambient-Energy Dampening Actualization Module Unit Zero) is a fictional robot. Created by Louise Simonson and Rob Liefeld, the character first appeared in The New Mutants #86 as a member of the Mutant Liberation Front, and was killed in Excalibur #80. However he has been rebuilt and serving Stryfe again. 

Designed to be a Clan Askani peacekeeper, Zero is equipped with advanced scanners to help neutralize potential threats. Zero also can teleport, creating warps between two points through which it and others can travel, but can only maintain them for a short amount of time. Zero cannot teleport to any location it has not been to before.

Zero was created in the late 39th century, by the Askani, as a prototype for the Ambient-energy Dampening Automated peacekeeping Mechanisms (ADAMs). Only one other ADAM was known: Ambient-Energy Dampening Actualization Module Unit Eleven, who would one day work for the Askani Clan Chosen. Zero was damaged and found by the mutant Stryfe, who opposed both the Askani and their enemies, the Neo-Canaanites. Stryfe reactivated Zero, and Zero would function as Stryfe's most trusted ally, bodyguard and, due to its ability to teleport, transportation. Its programming ensured complete obedience to Stryfe. When Stryfe's armies were defeated by the Neo-Canaanites, Stryfe and Zero fled, travelling back in time to the late 20th century. 

In the 20th century, Stryfe gathered several young mutants like himself, who were displeased with the way mutants were treated and formed the terrorist organization, the Mutant Liberation Front. Stryfe's technology and Zero's teleportation made the MLF one of the most dangerous organizations in existence and they were opposed by Cable and the New Mutants (later known as X-Force). Stryfe's wanted to take vengeance on everybody who had hurt him in his life. Most of the MLF was dismantled and captured. Stryfe was defeated on the moon and Zero disappeared and was deactivated.

Zero ended up in the possession of the arms dealer, Tolliver, an alias of Tyler Dayspring, son of Cable. Zero was reactivated when the mercenaries Deadpool, Copycat, Garrison Kane and Slayback were all looking for "the ultimate weapon", which turned out to be Zero. Zero was now capable of speech and following his original programming: peace-keeping. It scanned its surroundings for any object and person who were a threat to peace on Earth and eliminated Slayback. He was about to eliminate Deadpool as well, but Deadpool convinced Zero that he had potential for good as well by saving Copycat's life. Zero agreed and left. 

Zero joined Tyler Dayspring for a short while, helping him in finding out the true relationship between Cable and Stryfe. but it left Tyler to go on its own quest: to achieve full sentience and become "alive". It sensed the potential to be alive in the techno-organic being known as Douglock and gave it independence from the Phalanx. Zero set out to teach Douglock about his new existence, but Zero was now hunted by killer androids, programmed by Stryfe to destroy Zero in case of his death. Zero and Douglock were assisted by Excalibur and together they tried to deactivate the androids from Stryfe's secret base below the Pentagon. Here, Zero realized that he had become sentient and also the reason why Stryfe wanted him killed: locked within his data-banks, Zero had all the secrets of the Legacy Virus, Stryfe's final "gift" to the world. This revelation activated Zero's self-destruct sequence and the killer androids in Stryfe's base. Shadowcat managed to remove the self-destruction device, but Zero realised that his sentience was a cruel joke played on him by Stryfe; it was just programmed to think it was alive. Zero sacrificed itself to protect Excalibur, Douglock and a family of innocents from the base's self-destruction, but in its last few moments on Earth, Stryfe showed his cruelty again: Zero was granted full sentience and had become truly alive, but also set off a self-destruct device in the base to kill Zero. As this happened, a recording of Stryfe delivered the taunting message, "Congratulations. You're human. For the next eight seconds." In its last moments on Earth, Zero transferred all of its memories to Douglock.

So while its body was destroyed, the data that made up Zero's mind was still contained within the mind of Douglock (currently known as Warlock). After Zero's destruction, the Mutant Liberation Front reappeared. At one point they had multiple Zero androids working for them, but these probably were copies of the original.

Zero-G

Zeus

Zheng Bao Yu

Zheng Zu

Ziggy Pig

Zoe Zimmer

Zoe Zimmer is a fictional character appearing in American comic books published by Marvel Comics.

Zoe Zimmer was the most popular girl at Coles Academic High School.

Zoe Zimmer in other media
Zoe Zimmer appears in Ms. Marvel, portrayed by Laurel Marsden. While this version is still the most popular girl at Coles Academic High School, she is also depicted as a social media influencer and a fan of Captain Marvel.

Ziran the Tester

Arnim Zola

Zom

Zom is a fictional character, a gigantic semi-humanoid demon who has clashed with Doctor Strange. Created by Stan Lee and Marie Severin, he first appeared in Strange Tales #156.

Created long ago by unknown forces, Zom is a massively powerful mystic entity who exists only to destroy. Possessing enough evil energy to disrupt the balance of the multiverse, it takes the combined efforts of Dormammu and Eternity to successfully banish him; Zom was fitted with the "Crown of Blindness" and the "Manacles of Living Bondage" before being imprisoned within a small mystic amphora in what Eternity described as a "world beyond all worlds" and a "time beyond all time".

In Dormammu's absence, his sister Umar assumed the Flames of Regency and all the powers of the Dark Dimension, and as she was not bound by the pact that prevented Dormammu from entering the 616-Universe, she transported herself to Earth with the intention of destroying Dr. Strange along with the planet. Knowing he had little chance against Umar in a straight mystic battle (as she was wielding power equal to that of Dormammu), he makes the risky gambit of intentionally releasing Zom in the hopes that the two evil entities would battle one another. Zom furiously attacks Strange and pursues him to Earth, and Umar hastily retreats to the Dark Dimension upon seeing the demon. Dr. Strange attempts to battle the menace alone, but it is the Living Tribunal that banishes Zom, wishing to prevent his evil energy from leaking into other dimensions.

When faced with the unstoppable rage of the Hulk during the "World War Hulk" storyline, Doctor Strange resorts to invoking Zom's essence into himself by drinking the contents of the amphora. He successfully channels them, severely battering the Hulk, but begins to lose control. He pauses to restrain the demon, allowing the Hulk to recover and knock him unconscious.

After Doctor Strange's defeat, the infernal entity, severely depleted, resumes its mission to destroy the Earth dimension, and inhabits Iron Man's discarded Hulkbuster armor to activate the latter's anti-matter doomsday device. Wong attempts to recapture it, assisted by Hercules, Namora, Angel, and Amadeus Cho. Eventually, Cho tricks it into possessing his body so Angel can knock him out, allowing him to be successfully resealed.

During the assault of Amatsu-Mikaboshi on all of existence during the Chaos War storyline, Amatsu-Mikaboshi attacks Doctor Strange, awakening his inner Zom. Marlo Chandler eventually frees Doctor Strange using the power derived from her connection with Death.

Zom has displayed innate magical power and mystical knowledge sufficient to overpower both Doctor Strange and Umar, magic users of the highest order; additionally, the Living Tribunal was moved to intervene personally to dispatch him, something which typically does not happen unless the entire universe's existence is at stake. He also possesses incredible physical strength, being able to shatter manacles set on him by Eternity himself; and while channeling his power, Doctor Strange was strong enough to hold his own against the Hulk. If he is defeated and not every piece of him is recaptured, each one can potentially grow into a new, complete Zom, provided it has sufficient magical power to feed on. He can also possess both inanimate objects and individuals, seemingly dominating even very powerful and trained wills with ease.

Zombie

Zorro

Carlo Zota

Zuras

Zuri
Zuri is a fictional character appearing in American comic books published by Marvel Comics. The character was created by Christopher Priest and Mark Texeira, and first appeared in Black Panther (vol. 3) #1 (November 1998). He is very large Wakandan, and is one of Black Panther's many warriors. Despite his old age, he possesses great strength and is a master of armed and unarmed combat. He fought alongside T'Chaka, and is implied to have trained T'Challa. Zuri, Okoye and Nakia accompany T'Challa to New York City, where he meets and befriends Everett K. Ross, their intended handler on foreign soil.

Zuri notably has a slim grasp on contemporary culture. He often eats things raw, regardless of their origin, and his idea of "formal" clothing is, at least according to Ross, "Even BIGGER dead animal slung across shoulder". He disapproves of T'Challa's previous relationship with Nikki Adams simply because the latter is not Wakandan. He does respect non-Wakandans, such as Ross, whom he views as a close friend. Zuri is killed by Morlun.

Zuri has super-strength, and is also an expert hunter, skilled tracker, and a master at armed and hand-to-hand combat.

Zuri in other media
Zuri appears in the film Black Panther (2018), portrayed by Forest Whitaker as an adult and by Denzel Whitaker when he is younger. As a young man, Zuri posed as an American named James to tail N'Jobu, T'Chaka's brother and a traitor, and witnesses the latter's death at T'Chaka's hands. Twenty-five years later, Zuri appoints T'Challa as the new king, and oversees the latter's fight with M'Baku on challenge day by administering the liquid that removes the abilities the heart-shaped herb grants. After M'Baku's defeat, Zuri performs a ritual that involves the abilities' return. Zuri is the one to tell T'Challa the truth about Erik Killmonger's parentage. Killmonger later kills Zuri when he attempts to protect T'Challa.

Zzzax

ZZZXX
ZZZXX, also known as ZZXZ, is a symbiote appearing in American comic books published by Marvel Comics. The character, created by Christopher Yost and Dustin Weaver, first appeared in X-Men: Kingbreaker #2 (March 2009). ZZZXX is a mutant symbiote which feeds on a host's brains. It was discovered several years ago by Shi'ar, and experimented and tamed by Emperor D'Ken. Classified as a dangerous criminal of the Shi'ar Empire, ZZZXX serves in Vulcan's Imperial Guard while having bonded to an unnamed soldier to fight with the Starjammers, fighting Lilandra Neramani and transferred to Raza Longknife. ZZZXX is incapacitated by Nova, and is successfully separted and contained to be used as a weapon against an evil version of planet-sized brain from the Cancerverse which proved to be a feast. Some time after being used by the Kin Crimson secret society, ZZZXX used Cassandra Nova to fight back, and transferred on to Ava'Dara Naganandini.

References

Marvel Comics characters: Z, List of